This is a list of recordings of Macbeth, an opera by Giuseppe Verdi. The first performance of the work was on 14 March 1847 at the Teatro della Pergola in Florence. Verdi subsequently revised the work and the first performance of this version was on 21 April 1865 at the Théâtre Lyrique in Paris.

Some recordings and some performances today incorporate both Macbeth's final aria before he dies (from the original version) and the revised version's ending with the soldiers' chorus.

1847 original version

1865 revised version

References

Opera discographies
Operas by Giuseppe Verdi